Grochowski (feminine: Grochowska; plural: Grochowscy) is a Polish surname. It appears in various forms when transliterated from Cyrillic alphabets.

People
 Achacy Grochowski (died 1633), Polish Catholic bishop
 Agnieszka Grochowska (born 1979), Polish actress
 Gerd Grochowski (1956–2017), German opera singer
 John Grochowski (born c. 1952), American author
 Kazimierz Grochowski (1873–1937) Polish explorer and geologist
 Leon Grochowski (1886–1969), Polish Catholic bishop
 Stanisław Grochowski (died 1645), Polish Catholic bishop

Other
 21614 Grochowski, asteroid

See also
 
 

Polish-language surnames